This is a list of fellows of the Royal Society elected in 1787.

Fellows
 John Ash (c.1723–1798), physician
 William Bentinck (1764–1813)
 William Blizard (1743–1835)
 Thomas Gery Cullum (1741–1831)
 James Duff, 2nd Earl Fife (1729–1809)
 Ernest II, Duke of Saxe-Gotha-Altenburg (1745–1804)
 Thomas Erskine, 1st Baron Erskine (1750–1823)
 William Fordyce (1724–1792), Scottish physician
 George Trenchard Goodenough (b. 1743)
 Everard Home (1756–1832)
 Craven Ord (1756–1832), antiquarian
 Thomas Parkyns, 1st Baron Rancliffe (1755–1800)
 William Parsons (d. 1828), poet
 Arthur Leary Piggott (1748–1819), barrister and MP
 William Morton Pitt (1754–1836), MP
 Francis Rawdon Hastings, 1st Marquess of Hastings and 2nd Earl of Moira (1754–1826)
 Richard Relhan (1754–1823)
 Richard Anthony Salisbury (1761–1829)
 James Smithson (1765–1829)
 Luís Pinto de Sousa Coutinho (1735–1804), Portuguese diplomat
 George Leonard Staunton (1737–1801)
 Nicolas Vay de Vaja 
 Alexander Wedderburn, 1st Earl of Rosslyn (1733–1805)
 Henry Willoughby, 5th Baron Middleton (1726–1800)

References

1787
1787 in Great Britain
1787 in science